Tilton may refer to:

People 
Tilton (name)

Places 
 Tilton, Illinois, United States, a village
 Tilton, Iowa, an unincorporated community
 Tilton, Kentucky, an unincorporated community
 Tilton, New Hampshire, United States, a town
 Tilton School, a college preparatory school
 Tilton Northfield, New Hampshire, United States
 Tilton River, Washington, United States
 Fort Tilton, a fortification built in 1856 near what is now Fall City, Washington
 Tilton, Newfoundland and Labrador, Canada, a village
 Tilton on the Hill, a village in Harborough, Leicestershire, England
 Tilton on the Hill and Halstead, a civil parish formerly called just "Tilton"